H. Pemberton was a British 19th century historian, traveler, and writer. Possibly a female using a pseudonym, Pemberton wrote both fiction (i.e. Dacia Singleton) and non-fiction (i.e. The History of Monaco and A Winter Tour in Spain.)

Criticism for The History of Monaco
It was reviewed in The Spectator (22 February 1868) which printed the following: 
 It was considered by the London Chronicle as "contemporary literature." It was also reviewed in the Saturday Review of Politics, Literature, Science, Art, and Finance, Volume 25. Published on 13 June 1868, the review called Pemberton's history of Monaco a project that "serves nobody's purpose."

Works
Several of Pemberton's works were published by the Tinsley Brothers (William and Edward Tinsley) of 18 Catherine Street, Strand, London.

Credited to H. Pemberton
The History of Monaco: Past and Present (1867) The history of Monaco, past and present
A Winter Tour in Spain (1868) A winter tour in Spain

Published anonymously
Dacia Singleton (1867) (listed under "by the author of" on the cover page of A Winter Tour in Spain)
 Volume 1
 Volume 2
 Volume 3
Altogether Wrong (1870) 
The Only One of her Mother (1874) (listed as "by the author of Altogether Wrong and A Winter Tour in Spain" in Tinsleys' Magazine and The Spectator.
What Money Can't Do (unknown date of publication) (included in list under "by the author of" on the cover page of Dacia Singleton)
Will is the Cause of Woe ("by author of Another Wrong, Dacia Singleton, What Money Can't Do, etc.")

Theory about authorship
It has been theorized that H. Pemberton was the pseudonym of "Helen Crookshank" who married a man named Augustus Pemberton Gipps. The petition for divorce filed in 1862 by Gipps against Helen on accusation of adultery cited William Wentworth FitzWilliam Dick (Member of Parliament, and himself married) as accomplice in the alleged wrong.

References

19th-century English writers
19th-century English historians
English travel writers
Writers of lost works
Year of birth unknown
Year of death unknown
Pseudonymous women writers
19th-century pseudonymous writers